Lauterpacht is a surname. Notable people with the surname include:

 Hersch Lauterpacht (1897–1960)
 Elihu Lauterpacht (1928–2017), British academic and lawyer, son of Hersch

See also
 Lauterpacht Centre for International Law (LCIL), the Faculty of Law, Cambridge, England